This is a list of social nudity places in South America used for recreation.

Nude beaches
This list includes topfree beaches, clothing-optional beaches (or nude beaches) and some resorts. Topfree beaches allow women to sunbathe without a bikini top or other clothing above the waist. Clothing-optional beaches allow either sex to sunbathe with or without clothing above or below the waist. A nude beach may also be an obligatory nude area, which means that both sexes are obliged to go without clothing above as well as below the waist.

Argentina

 Villa Gesell: Playa Querandí
 Moreno: Eden guesthouse

Brazil

Public nudity is a misdemeanor in Brazil, except in places officially designated by the local authority.

Bahia
Praia do Encanto, beach in Bahia State, middle-south of Tinharé Island or Morro de São Paulo, 2 hours by boat south from Salvador.

Espírito Santo

Paraíba
Tambaba

Rio de Janeiro
Praia do Abricó, beach west of Rio de Janeiro (Note: no land and restricted cellular telephone service—some providers do not cover this area.)
Olho de Boi (Bull's Eye Beach) is one of the beaches in Búzios, in Rio de Janeiro State, and the most popular official nude beach in Brazil for gays.
Jurubá – in the historic city of Paraty, in the state of Rio.
Praia Brava – a beach shared by nudists and surfers, in Cabo Frio, north of the state of Rio.
Praia Brava – a beach in Trindade, close to Paraty, south of Rio de Janeiro state.

Santa Catarina
Praia da Galheta, Santa Catarina, a partially deserted clothes-optional beach on the east coast of Florianópolis (can be reached only by foot)
Pedras Altas, Santa Catarina, between Florianópolis and Garopaba,
Praia do Pinho, in Santa Catarina, next to Balneário Camboriú (often simply referred to as Balneário by locals), near Florianópolis

São Paulo
Brava Beach, in the Boissucanga section of São Sebastião

Note: Copacabana beach in Rio de Janeiro is not a nude beach, despite its depiction as such in the 1984 motion picture Blame It on Rio.

Chile
Horcón: Playa Luna, beach in Caleta Horcón, near Puchuncaví at North of Valparaiso Province.
Iquique: Playa Luna Norte, beach near Iquique at Tarapaca Region, at North of Chile.
Coulimo: Playa Luna Sur, beach in Coulimo near Tomé and Concepción at Biobio Region, at South of Chile.
Pichilemu: Playa La Pancora, beach near Punta de Lobosat South of Pichilemu  and Playa Chorrillos at North of Pichilemu, in O'Higgins Region.
Arica: Playa Corazones has long been a site for nudists. In the 1990s, attempts were made to make it an official nudist beach, but these attempts failed due to the intervention of the local churches.
Antofagasta: Playa Escondida (not an official nudist beach but nudity is tolerated there).

Colombia
Tayrona Park, West from Cabo San Juan all the way until you can go no further and there's a nudist beach.

Ecuador

Peru

Uruguay

Chihuahua beach in Maldonado
La Sirena beach in Aguas Dulces

Venezuela
Playa Miami, a nude beach located near Laguna de Tacarigua.
Playa Mono Manso, Playa Yaguarita and Playa Kapino, located near Chuspa.
Playa El Diario and Playa Grande, near Choroní.
Cayos de Morrocoy (in a few of the cays), Isla de Margarita, Playa Acuarela and Playa El Agua.

Resorts and pools
Unlike public beaches, these are private property which admits the public.

Argentina
Yatan Rumi near Tanti, Córdoba Province. A naturist reserve located in the nearby mountains with 1,200 hectares.
Ruca Chauke in Rosario.
La Pachamama in Moreno.

Brazil
Bahia
Ecovila da Mata, in the municipality of Entre Rios, Bahia.
Pousada Rio e Mar at the Massarandupió beach in Entre Rios.
Quinta das Flores, in the municipality of Entre Rios, Bahia, Massarandupió village.
Encantos de Massarandupió, in the municipality of Entre Rios, Bahia, Massarandupió village.

Paraíba
Pousada Villamor, Coqueirinho Beach, municipality of Jacumã, close to Tambaba nude beach.

Rio de Janeiro
Recanto Paraíso Naturist Resort in the municipality of Piraí.

Rio Grande do Sul
Hotel Ocara, in the municipality of Colinas do Sul.

São Paulo
Mirante do Paraíso. Closed/discontinued since 2020 in the municipality of Igaratá.
Rincão Naturista Clube, in the municipality of Rincão.

Uruguay
Chihuahua Resort (Chihuahua)

See also 

 List of places where social nudity is practised
 List of social nudity places in North America

Notes

References 

South America
South America
South America-related lists
Lists of places